A statue of David Farragut by Henry Hudson Kitson is installed in Boston's Marine Park, in the U.S. state of Massachusetts. The sculpture was cast in 1891. It was surveyed by the Smithsonian Institution's "Save Outdoor Sculpture!" program in 1997.

See also

 1891 in art

References

1891 sculptures
Monuments and memorials in Boston
Outdoor sculptures in Boston
Sculptures of men in Massachusetts
Statues in Boston